Air Chief Marshal Srinivasapuram Krishnaswamy PVSM, AVSM, VM & Bar, ADC (born January 1943) is a former Air Officer in the Indian Air Force (IAF). He served as the 19th Chief of the Air Staff from 2001 to 2004. He raised the first electronic warfare squadron in the Indian Air Force. He has the rare distinction of having commanded three operational commands of the IAF - the Western, South-Western and Central Air Commands.

Early life and education
Krishnaswamy was born on 18 January 1943 in Madras. He completed his schooling as well as his college education in the same city.

Military career
Krishnaswamy was commissioned as a fighter pilot in December 1961. In the early years of his service, he flew the Hawker Hunter, the Folland Gnat and the Mikoyan-Gurevich MiG-21. During the Indo-Pakistani War of 1965, he flew the Gnats and was mentioned in dispatches. Subsequently, he was trained in the United Kingdom to become a test pilot. On his return, he joined the Aircraft and System Training Establishment (ASTE). He qualified as a fighter combat leader and served as a senior directing staff at the premier Tactics and Air Combat Development Establishment (TACDE). For his tenure at TACDE, he was awarded the Vayu Sena Medal on 26 January 1978.

Krishnaswamy specialised in electronic warfare (EW) and raised and commanded the first EW Squadron of the IAF. The squadron consisted of MiG-21 and English Electric Canberra aircraft. For his stint as Commanding Officer of the squadron, he was awarded the bar to the Vayu Sena Medal on 26 January 1982. He subsequently served as the Deputy Air Advisor to the High Commissioner of India to the United Kingdom at India House, London. Promoted to the rank of Group Captain, he served as the Chief Operations Officer of the Maharajpur Air Force Station in Gwalior.

Krishnaswamy was promoted to the rank of Air Commodore on 1 September 1988 and took over as the Director of Air Staff requirements at Air headquarters. In January 1990, he took command of the premier base for the Mikoyan MiG-29 and SEPECAT Jaguar maritime aircraft - Lohegaon Air Force Station. After a successful tenure as Air Officer Commanding, he attended the prestigious National Defence College, New Delhi. In February 1993, Krishnaswamy was promoted to the acting rank of Air Vice Marshal and moved to Air HQ taking over as the Assistant Chief of Air Staff (Plans). After a three-year stint as ACAS Plans, he was promoted to the rank of Air Marshal and was appointed Deputy Chief of Air Staff (DCAS). On 26 January 1996, he was awarded the Ati Vishisht Seva Medal.

Krishnaswamy was promoted to Commander-in-Chief grade on 1 April 1997 and appointed Air Officer Commanding-in-Chief Central Air Command at Allahabad. After a short stint, he was appointed AOC-in-C South Western Air Command (SWAC) at Jodhpur in November. On 26 January 1998, he was awarded the Param Vishisht Seva Medal for distinguished service of the highest order. Under Krishnaswamy, in view of the increased operational importance of SWAC, it was decided by Air HQ that the headquarters of SWAC would move from Jodhpur to Gandhinagar. He oversaw this move and the new HQ SWAC was inaugurated on 1 May 1998 by the then Chief Minister of Gujarat Keshubhai Patel. He served in this appointment during the Kargil War. He was awarded the Agni Award for Self Reliance in August 1999 for promoting indigenous development in the Indian Armed services. On 1 November 1999, he was appointed AOC-in-C of the premier Western Air Command (WAC). He took command from Air Marshal Vinod Patney at HQ WAC. He thus has the rare distinction of having commanded three operational commands of the IAF.

On 1 August 2001, Krishnaswamy moved to Air HQ after being appointed Vice Chief of the Air Staff. On 30 October 2001, the Government of India announced that Krishnaswamy was appointed the next Chief of the Air Staff.

Krishnaswamy took over as the 19th Chief of the Air Staff on 31 December 2001 from Air Chief Marshal Anil Yashwant Tipnis. He served as full tenure of three years and relinquished command on 31 December 2004, handing over to Air Chief Marshal Shashindra Pal Tyagi.

Awards and decorations

Dates of rank

References

Living people
Indian Air Force officers
Recipients of the Param Vishisht Seva Medal
Chiefs of Air Staff (India)
Vice Chiefs of Air Staff (India)
Military personnel from Chennai
1943 births
National Defence College, India alumni
Recipients of the Vayu Sena Medal
Recipients of the Ati Vishisht Seva Medal